A Kiss for Cinderella is a play by J. M. Barrie. It was first produced in London at Wyndham's Theatre on March 16, 1916, starring Gerald du Maurier and Hilda Trevelyan, enjoying great success over 156 performances, and with several annual Christmastime revivals.

It was later seen on Broadway, starring Maude Adams, opening at the Empire Theatre on 25 December 1916, and running for 152 performances. In 1925 it was made into a silent feature film, A Kiss for Cinderella, by Paramount, directed by Herbert Brenon and starring Betty Bronson.

Hilda Trevelyan created the role of Miss Thing, a poor London girl who takes care of a group of refugee children from various countries during the First World War.  She adores the story of Cinderella and dreams, in an impoverished state, of being at the ball.

Plot

Act One. The play is set in London, with World War I and the German zeppelin raids going on. Mr. Bodie, a kindly middle-aged artist of independent means, is visited in his studio by a policeman who wants to admonish him about showing a light in the blackout and to ask him about suspicious activities on the part of his cleaning girl. This is a charming waif in her teens, whose name is apparently Jane Thing but whom Mr. Bodie has renamed Cinderella for her bravery and sweetness amid the drudgery of her job. She had not heard the story of Cinderella before Mr. Bodie so named her, but has now read it and completely identifies with the character; she thinks Mr. Bodie has called her that for her exquisite small feet. The policeman suspects her because she collects wooden boards, asks questions about the royals and knows German words. He observes her from hiding when she comes in, then emerges and talks to her. He is diverted from his suspicions by her lively talk, and ends by addressing her contention that she is a nobleman’s daughter by giving her his “infallible” test; it proves her to be “common clay”, because a lady hides her treasures in her bodice and a common girl puts hers in her pocket. When she leaves to go home, he follows her.

Act Two. The setting is Cinderella’s poor street on a snowy night, with a flat that rises to show her room. She earns pennies from her neighbours by various sewing, healing and morale-bolstering jobs. She has used her boards to build large boxes which are fastened to the wall several feet up. The policeman finds out that these are the safe havens for four little children, war orphans of various nationalities, one of whom is German, hence her learning the words. He leaves satisfied. Cinderella believes that this is the night when she will go to the ball—she has arbitrarily decided this because it has to be sometime—and, after putting the awed children to bed, she steps outside so her fairy godmother won’t miss the house.

The fairy godmother duly arrives, wearing a Red Cross uniform, and grants Cinderella’s three wishes: to go to her ball, to help nurse the wounded, and to gain the love of the man of her heart. The ball follows. It is a working-class girl’s vision of utmost splendour: everything is gilded and ceremonious, but everyone from the King and Queen on down speaks and acts informally. The children are there in a special balcony to see Cinderella’s triumph. The Prince, who resembles the Policeman but is a bored cad, judges the marriageable girls at the ball in the manner of a horse show, including having their temperatures taken to see who is morally good. When Cinderella arrives, dressed splendidly in a gown of inexpensive fabric, he is still bored and rude as she passes the thermometer test, but when she shows him her feet he is instantly transformed into a true lover filled with all the virtues. They are married by the stuffed penguin in Mr. Bodie’s studio, who is a bishop, and dance, but midnight strikes and Cinderella’s splendour vanishes. The ballroom dissolves, and she is seen to be lying asleep on her doorstep in the snow, near death from freezing.

Act Three. The setting is a country house which has been taken over to use as a nursing home for wounded soldiers. Mr. Bodie’s sister, Dr. Bodie, is tending Cinderella, whom the policeman found and took to the hospital and whom Mr. Bodie then got into his sister’s care. He is looking after her orphans. He comes to see her, and hears from Dr. Bodie with dismay that she has little chance of getting well. She is weak and confined to a bed on casters, but is making bandages to help nurse the wounded and is charming all the other patients and nurses. She rejoices in having enough to eat for the first time, and admits that she now, with enough food in her, knows she isn’t really the Cinderella. She has tea with an orderly who was a plumber in civilian life and a young daughter of the upper classes who is an eager though incompetent nurses’ aide; the latter two agree that their friendship is one of the best things in their lives and they won’t have as much fun when class separates them after the war. The policeman comes to visit, and Cinderella produces the letter he has written her, which she treasures, from her bodice. He asks her to marry him, and, when she says yes, presents her with a specially made pair of glass slippers instead of a ring. But when he embraces her, he turns his face away because “Dr. Bodie has told him something.”

References

External links
Review
A Kiss For Cinderella

Play script of A Kiss for Cinderella on the Great War Theatre website
 

English plays
1916 plays
Broadway plays
British plays adapted into films
Plays by J. M. Barrie